Chuvash State Pedagogical University (I. Ya. Yakovlev Chuvash State Pedagogical University) is the first national higher educational institution of the Chuvash Republic, located in Cheboksary.

History
The university was founded in 1930, opened by the decree of the Central Executive Committee and the Council of People's Commissars of the RSFSR in October 1930 as the Chuvash State Pedagogical Institute.
It is the first university of the republic.

The Institute had departments: physical and technical; social and literary with sections of social and political, Chuvash language and literature, Russian language and literature; agronomic; chemical and biological; preschool; political and educational; labor; as well as preparatory courses and the Chuvash pedagogical labor faculty.

In 1934, the departments were reorganized into the faculties of History, Language and Literature, Natural Science, and Physics and Mathematics. In the same year, the teachers ' Institute was organized at the institute, which functioned until 1952.

By the decree of the Council of Ministers of the RSFSR in 1958, the university was named after the Chuvash teacher-educator Ivan Yakovlevich Yakovlev.

Since 1993, Professor Ivlev D. D., the founder of the scientific school of mechanics in Chuvashia, worked here.

University today 
The number of students is more than 5.5 thousand people. The University provides higher professional training in 91 bachelor's degree programs, 4 specialty programs, and 41 master's degree programs at 10 faculties

Currently, the graduate school trains postgraduates in 25 specialties in 9 branches of science.

The newspapers "Pedvuzovets", scientific journals of the Higher Attestation Commission "Bulletin of the I. Ya. Yakovlev ChSPU", "Bulletin of the I. Ya. Yakovlev CHSPU: The series" Mechanics of the limit state»

The high position of the university in the Russian education system is confirmed by the ratings of the Ministry of Education of the Russian Federation.

See also 
 Chuvash State University
 Chuvash State Agrarian University
 Cheboksary Physics and Mathematics School
 Chuvash State Academic Song and Dance Ensemble
 Chuvash State Symphony Capella

References

External links
 Official website

Universities in Volga Region
Buildings and structures in Chuvashia
Cheboksary
Cultural heritage monuments in Chuvashia
Objects of cultural heritage of Russia of regional significance